Kelly Harrison (born 1980) is a British model and actress. Initially a model for four years, she was cast in BBC's Saturday night programme, Casualty, as paramedic Nikki Marshall. Harrison has also appeared in Born and Bred, Waking the Dead, Dalziel and Pascoe, Paddington Green, Where the Heart Is, and in ITV's chilling drama Marian, Again, in which Harrison had the title role. Harrison then appeared in the BBC drama Age Before Beauty alongside Sue Johnston and Robson Green which aired in July 2018.

Filmography

Film

Television

References

External links

Living people
1980 births
Actors from Doncaster
Actresses from Yorkshire
English television actresses
Place of birth missing (living people)